Eureka United Methodist Church is a historic Methodist church located on Church Street in Eureka, Wayne County, North Carolina. It was built in 1884, and is a one-story, three bays wide and four bays deep, vernacular Carpenter Gothic style church.  It has steeply pitched gable front roof and bell tower with lancet windows.

It was listed on the National Register of Historic Places in 1982.

References

United Methodist churches in North Carolina
Churches on the National Register of Historic Places in North Carolina
Churches completed in 1884
19th-century Methodist church buildings in the United States
Churches in Wayne County, North Carolina
National Register of Historic Places in Wayne County, North Carolina